"But I Feel Good" is a single by the group Groove Armada from their fourth album, Lovebox. Reaching position 50 in the UK Singles Chart, the song found later fame through use as the lead theme in the computer and video game Brian Lara International Cricket 2007 (PC, Xbox 360); and through an advertising campaign for Mars and Snickers chocolate bars in Australia and was also used in a promo for Disney Channel in the mid 2000s. The song was also featured in the credits to the 2004 film Wimbledon.

2003 singles
2002 songs
Groove Armada songs
Songs written by Andy Cato